Company is the second solo album by former Razorlight and current We Are Scientists drummer Andy Burrows. The album was written and co-produced by Burrows as well as most of the instrumentation being played by him. It was released on 22 October 2012. Burrows later released the songs: Hometown, Because I Know That I Can, Keep Moving On, and If I Had A Heart as singles, all of which failed to chart.

Track listing 

"Company"
"Because I Know That I Can"
"Keep on Moving On"
"Maybe You"
"If I Had a Heart"
"Hometown"
"Somebody Calls Your Name"
"Stars in the Sky"
"Shaking the Colour"
"Pet Air"

References 

Andy Burrows albums
2012 albums